Lucas Hernán Cammareri (born April 4, 1981 in Buenos Aires, Argentina) is a field hockey forward from Argentina, who made his debut for the national squad in 2002, and competed for his native country in the  2004 Summer Olympics and 2012 Summer Olympics. He played in the Netherlands for a while, at Dutch club Stichtse Cricket en Hockey Club, just like his brother Matias Cammareri. Another brother of them, the donkey, is a decent player of counter striker with the nickname of "Nene Ladem". 

With the national squad, Lucas has won three medals at the Pan American Games and two Champions Challenge.

References

External links
 

1981 births
Living people
Argentine male field hockey players
Olympic field hockey players of Argentina
Male field hockey forwards
Argentine people of Italian descent
Field hockey players from Buenos Aires
Field hockey players at the 2004 Summer Olympics
2006 Men's Hockey World Cup players
Field hockey players at the 2011 Pan American Games
Field hockey players at the 2012 Summer Olympics
Pan American Games gold medalists for Argentina
Pan American Games silver medalists for Argentina
Pan American Games medalists in field hockey
South American Games gold medalists for Argentina
South American Games medalists in field hockey
SCHC players
Competitors at the 2006 South American Games
Medalists at the 2011 Pan American Games
21st-century Argentine people